Kizoura was a town of ancient Bithynia. Its name does not occur in ancient authors but is inferred from epigraphic and other evidence.

Its site is tentatively located near Umurbey in Asiatic Turkey.

References

Populated places in Bithynia
Former populated places in Turkey
History of Sakarya Province